The beys of Tunis were the monarchs of Tunisia from 1705, when the Husainid dynasty acceded to the throne, until 1957, when monarchy was abolished.

History

The Husainid dynasty, originally of Cretan Turkish origin, came to power under Al-Husayn I ibn Ali on July 15, 1705, replacing the Muradid dynasty. For most of their rule, the Husainids ruled with the title of Bey. The Husainids ruled the Beylik of Tunis under the suzerainty of the Ottoman Empire until May 12, 1881, when Muhammad III as-Sadiq signed the Treaty of Bardo and the Beylik of Tunis came under the control of France as a protectorate. Following independence from France on March 20, 1956, the Kingdom of Tunisia was proclaimed and the Bey Muhammad VIII al-Amin assumed the title of King. He reigned as such until the Prime Minister Habib Bourguiba deposed the Husainid dynasty and declared Tunisia a one-party republic on July 25, 1957, ruling as President for life until he was deposed in 1987.

Beys of Tunis (1705–1956)

King of Tunisia (1956–1957)

Genealogical tree
Simplified genealogical tree of the Beys of Tunis. Only the Beys and their direct ancestors are shown.

Residence 

Each bey has his palace because, according to tradition, he can not live in the palace of his predecessor for respect for his widows. Among the most important are those of Bardo, Ksar Said, Carthage, Hammam-Lif, Mornag or La Goulette. About the Bardo Palace, the French botanist René Louiche Desfontaines who visited Tunisia at the end of the eighteenth century, left the following description:

"The bey lives in a pretty castle called Bardo, located in the middle of a large plain, three quarters of the north of the city. This castle is very old: Leo Africanus confirms that, in his time, kings have already make their stay. The wall that surrounds it is well built, and defended by some pieces of cannon placed on the side of the door. The court of the bey is numerous; the officers who compose it are, in general, very honest and very polite towards foreigners. "

Many have been converted after the abolition of the monarchy: the Bardo Palace hosts the Bardo National Museum (Tunis) and the Assembly of the Representatives of the People while the Carthage Palace became the headquarters of the Tunisian Academy of Sciences, Letters, and Arts.

Popular culture
The colors of the Bey of Tunis, the red and the green which are components of the country's coat of arms. They are also those of the football club of the Stade Tunisien which was under his patronage.

They are also found in Tunisian pastries: one, called Bey sigh, is made of pink, green and white marzipan; the other, called bey's baklawa, is a form of Tunisian baklava.

Queen consort of Tunisia

The queen consort of Tunisia (Spouse of Bey of Tunis) is called Lalla Beya in reference to her husband.

She had little or no role in state affairs and did not accompany her husband on diplomatic visits abroad or at official dinners at the palace. Her only concern was the management of the palace and the harem.

The first queen consort of the Husainid dynasty was Lalla Jannat, as wife of Al-Husayn I ibn Ali. Most beys have multiple spouses because polygamy was in use until the adoption of the Code of Personal Status in Tunisia. Very few have taken a single spouse, like Muhammad VIII al-Amin, who married only Lalla Jeneïna Beya (1887–1960) in 1902. She was the last queen consort of Tunisia before the establishment of the republic on 25 July 1957.

Queen Lalla Kmar (1862–1942) was queen consort of Tunisia during three reigns, after having successively married Muhammad III as-Sadiq, Ali III ibn al-Husayn and Muhammad V an-Nasir, and played a notable role in the affairs of the kingdom. Muhammad V an-Nasir published a decree ordering the protection of Lalla Kmar, the absence of infringement of her rights and granting her a salary. He also built the Essaâda palace in La Marsa for her honor during World War I, between 1914 and 1915.

See also
Tunisia
List of French residents-general in Tunisia
President of Tunisia
List of presidents of Tunisia
First Lady of Tunisia
Prime Minister of Tunisia
List of prime ministers of Tunisia
Lists of office-holders
List of current heads of state and government

References

 
Tunis
Beys of Tunis